Canned Carrott is a comedy stand-up and sketch-show by Jasper Carrott. It gave rise to a spin-off series, and made the names of regular contributors Steve Punt and Hugh Dennis.

Two of the regular sketches were "Wiggy" and "The Detectives". "Wiggy" followed the adventures of a man with an unconvincing wig (played by Carrott). It was a slapstick comedy in which the characters were silent except for the narrator, similar in style to Mr. Bean or The Benny Hill Show.

The most popular sketch segment was "The Detectives", featuring two mediocre police officers, Briggs and Louis (played by Carrott and Robert Powell), who tried unsuccessfully to emulate the actions of television detectives. Such was the popularity of this sketch that it became the basis of another television comedy series, The Detectives.

Steve Punt and Hugh Dennis subsequently joined the cast of The Mary Whitehouse Experience, and later got their own sketch show, called The Imaginatively Titled Punt & Dennis Show, which ran for two series.

Cast
Jasper Carrott – Himself/Various Characters (including Bob Louis in "The Detectives" and Wiggy)
Hugh Dennis – Various Characters
Nosher Powell		
Robert Powell – Dave Briggs (segment "The Detectives")
Steve Punt – Various Characters
Enn Reitel – Narrator (segment "Wiggy") (voice)
George Sewell – Supt Cottam (segment "The Detectives")

Transmissions
 Series 1: 6 episodes, 3 October 1990 to 7 November 1990
 Specially Selected Canned Carrott: 3 and 10 September 1991
 Series 2: 6 episodes, 21 November 1991 to 2 January 1992
 More Specially Selected Canned Carrott: 15 September 1992
 The Juicy Bits: 24 May 1994
 More Juicy Bits: 1 July 1995
 Extra Juicy Bits: 26 August 1995

References

BBC television comedy
BBC television sketch shows
1990 British television series debuts
1995 British television series endings
1990s British comedy television series
Television series created by Steven Knight